A puggle is a dog crossbred from a pug and a beagle.

The puggle was first bred by designer dog breeders in the United States with the aim of producing a healthy companion dog that is less likely to inherit some health and behavioural issues common in the parent breeds. The cross is less likely to inherit a number of serious health issues common in the pug, particularly breathing issues associated with the breed's brachycephalic head, and is also less likely to inherit the energy, scent drive, and howl of the beagle; but because of the unpredictable nature of crossing two established breeds, puggles can still inherit both breathing disorders and high energy levels.

Pugs and beagles were first deliberately crossed and marketed as companion dogs in the US in the 1980s, although designer dog breeders began breeding them in large numbers from the 1990s when the portmanteau "puggle" was first used to market the cross. The puggle has subsequently become a popular designer dog crossbreeds in the United States, where it has attracted a number of celebrity owners. In 2005 it was named the "Hottest dog of 2005" and in 2006 puggle sales accounted for more than 50% of all crossbreed dog sales in that country.

See also
 List of dog crossbreeds
 It's Bruno! TV show featuring a puggle

References

Companion dogs
Dog crossbreeds